Enphase Energy, Inc. is an American energy technology company headquartered in Fremont, California, that develops and manufactures solar micro-inverters, battery energy storage, and EV charging stations primarily for residential customers. Enphase was established in 2006 and is the first company to successfully commercialize the solar micro-inverter, which converts the direct current (DC) power generated by a solar panel into grid-compatible alternating current (AC) for use or export. The company has shipped more than 48 million microinverters to 2.5 million solar systems in more than 140 countries.

History 
Most solar photovoltaic systems use a central inverter, where the panels are connected together in a series creating a string, which delivers all the direct current (DC) power produced into the inverter for conversion into grid-compatible alternating current (AC). The major drawback to this approach is that the entire string’s output is limited by the output of the lowest-performing panel. Solar micro-inverters address this problem by converting the DC into AC in a small inverter placed behind each individual solar panel.

Enphase founder Martin Fornage discovered this issue when he saw the low performance of the central inverter for the solar array on his ranch. Fornage was looking for a new opportunity after the 2001 Telecoms crash and brought an idea to build micro-inverters to his former Cerent Corporation colleague, Raghu Belur, and they formed PVI Solutions. The two hired Paul Nahi to be CEO at the end of 2006 and the trio formed Enphase Energy, Inc. in early 2007. Enphase raised $6 million in private equity, and in 2008, released its first microinverter, the M175. Their second generation product, 2009's M190, had sales of about 400,000 units in 2009 and early 2010. Enphase grew to 13% marketshare for residential systems by mid-2010.

Enphase went public in March 2012 and began trading on the Nasdaq with the stock symbol ENPH.

In October 2014, Enphase announced it would enter the battery home energy storage market. The first batteries were installed in Australia in mid-2016, but the launch of the system in the North American market was delayed until July 2020.

Enphase experienced leadership changes in September 2017 when the President and CEO, Paul Nahi, announced his resignation from the company. Badri Kothandaraman was appointed the company’s new President and CEO. Kothandaraman was previously the company’s Chief Operating Officer.

, Enphase had about a 48% market share for residential installations in the US, which represents 72% of the entire world micro-inverter market. In the global market for inverters for all customers (residential, commercial and industrial), microinverters have a 1.7% share of the inverter market.

In 2021, Enphase completed a series of acquisitions that focused on software-as-a-service and home electrification: Sofdesk’s Solargraf, a software platform offering digital tools and services to support the sales process for solar installers; the Solar Design Services business of DIN Engineering Services, a software service provider for solar proposal drawings and permit plan sets; 365 Pronto, a software platform that connects solar installers with operations and maintenance providers; and ClipperCreek, a company that offers electric vehicle (EV) charging solutions for residential and commercial customers in the U.S.

Also in 2021, the company launched its eighth-generation microinverter technology, the IQ8 series, to customers in North America. , Enphase has shipped more than 48 million microinverters and deployed more than two million Enphase-based systems in more than 140 countries.

In 2022, Enphase completed the acquisition of SolarLeadFactory LLC, a company that provides leads to solar installers.

Products 
All Enphase microinverters are completely self-contained power converters. In the case of a rooftop photovoltaic (PV) inverter, the unit will convert DC from a single solar panel into grid-compliant AC power, following the maximum power point of the panel. Since the "S" series microinverters (e.g. S280) all Enphase microinverters have been both Advanced Grid Function and Bidirectional power capable. This allows a microinverter to produce power in the DC-AC direction, for solar applications, or in the DC-AC and AC-DC directions, for battery use. The microinverter(s) in the Enphase battery products are the same units as installed on the roof, with only software settings changed.

Legacy products 
The M175 was the first product from Enphase, released in 2008. It was designed to output 175 Watts of AC power. The M175 was packaged in a relatively large cast aluminum box. Wiring was passed through the case using compression fittings and the inverters connected to each other using a twist-lock connection. The product saw modest sales.

Sales picked up with the second generation M190, released in 2009. The M190 had a slightly higher power rating of 190 Watts, but in a much smaller case with built-in cable connections replacing the earlier compression fittings.

Around the same time the company also released the D380, which was essentially two M190's in a single larger case. For small inverters like the M190, the case and its assembly represented a significant portion of the total cost of production, so by placing two in a single box that cost is spread out. The D380 also introduced a new inter-inverter cabling system based on a "drop cable" system. This placed a single connector on a short cable on the inverter, and used a separate cable with either one or three connectors on it. Arrays were constructed by linking together up to three D380s with a single drop cable, and then connecting them to other drop cables using larger twist-fit connectors.

The third generation M215 was introduced in 2011 bumping up the power rating to 215 Watts and adding trunk cabling, which increased installation speed by using one long cable run, with the inverters spliced in as necessary.

The fourth generation M250 was released in 2013, increasing the power rating to 250 Watts and efficiency to 96.5%. The fourth generation added an integrated grounding system, eliminating the external grounding conductor. Enphase continued to offer the M215 but updated it with the integrated grounding system.

In 2015, the company launched its fifth generation of products. The "S" series S230 and S280 microinverters with power ratings of 230 and 280 Watts, increased efficiency of 97% and added advanced grid functionality like reactive power control along with bidirectional capabilities allowing the micro-inverter to also convert AC into DC for battery use.

The next-gen Envoy-S offers revenue-grade metering of solar production, consumption monitoring, and integrated Wi-Fi. The company also moved into home energy storage with its storage system featuring an AC Battery, a modular, 1.2kWh lithium-iron phosphate offering aimed at residential users that is part of a Home Energy Solution. The Home Energy Solution launched in Australia in mid-2016.

Current products 
Since 2017, Enphase has been offering its "IQ" series microinverters which use a simplified cabling system with two conductors (down from four) that eliminated the need for a neutral line. The first to be introduced was the IQ6, with the older M215, M250 and S280 remaining on sale but updated to use the new cabling system. The updated IQ7 series was launched in 2018.

In 2021, the IQ8 Microinverter was introduced as a grid-forming microinverter, enabling solar-only backup during grid outages. It features a split-phase power conversion capability to convert DC power to AC power more efficiently and an application-specific integrated circuit (ASIC), which enables the device to operate in grid-tied or off-grid modes. This chip is built in 55nm technology with high-speed digital logic and has fast response times to changing loads and grid events, alleviating constraints on battery sizing for home energy systems.

In 2020, the company introduced the Enphase Encharge storage system, now known as the IQ Battery, to customers in North America and expansion into parts of Europe began in 2021. The IQ Battery features lithium iron phosphate (LFP) battery chemistry and comes in two capacity size configurations, 10.08kWh and 3.36kWh. Both configurations are compatible with new and existing Enphase solar systems with IQ6, IQ7, or IQ8 Microinverters. 

All Enphase Energy Systems with microinverters and batteries are paired with an IQ System Controller, which provides microgrid interconnection device (MID) functionality by automatically detecting and transitioning the system from grid power to backup power in the event of a grid failure. 

In 2021, Enphase Energy Systems added the option of including software to integrate most AC home standby generators. And the IQ Load Controller is a hardware add-on feature that enables systems to shed non-essential loads automatically or manually to further extend battery life and system capabilities.

All Enphase microinverter models use power line communications to pass monitoring data between the inverters and the Envoy communications gateway, now known as the IQ Gateway. The IQ Gateway stores daily performance data for up to a year, and, when available, allows Enphase's web service platform to download data approximately every 15 minutes. Customers and installers can review the data on the web services platform and Enphase App.

References

External links 
 

Photovoltaic inverter manufacturers
Companies listed on the Nasdaq
Solar energy companies of the United States
Solar energy in California
Manufacturing companies based in California
Technology companies based in the San Francisco Bay Area
Energy companies established in 2006
2006 establishments in California
American companies established in 2006
Renewable resource companies established in 2006
Companies based in Sonoma County, California
Fremont, California
Energy in the San Francisco Bay Area
2012 initial public offerings